Årdal is a municipality in Sogn og Fjordane county, Norway.

Årdal or Aardal may also refer to:

People
Asgeir Årdal (born 1983), a Norwegian cross-country skier
Hans Aardal (1921-1995), a Norwegian politician for the Conservative Party
Karen Aardal (born 1961), Norwegian and Dutch applied mathematician

Places
Årdal, Rogaland, a former municipality in Rogaland county, Norway
Årdal, Hjelmeland, a village in Hjelmeland municipality, Rogaland county, Norway
Øvre Årdal, a village in Årdal municipality, Vestland county, Norway

Other uses
Årdal FK, a Norwegian football club based in Årdal municipality, Sogn og Fjordane county, Norway

See also
Årdal Church (disambiguation)
Ardal (disambiguation)